Larry Taylor (13 July 1918 – 6 August 2003) was an English actor and stuntman.
He spent a dozen years in the army before World War II. After demobilization he got a job in the film industry.
He was the father of Rocky Taylor. Taylor mainly played villainous supporting roles in dozens of UK films and television episodes from the 1950s until the early 1970s, when he moved to South Africa in the mid-1970s, and from then on he appeared in a mixture of international movies filmed there and domestic South African films and television episodes.

Selected filmography

 The Captive Heart (1946) - Sergeant (uncredited)
 No Orchids for Miss Blandish (1948) - Cop (uncredited)
 Silent Dust (1949) - Lorry driver in flashback sequence (uncredited)
 The Glass Mountain (1949) - Sleeping Man (uncredited)
 Cardboard Cavalier (1949) - Rider (uncredited)
 The Case of Charles Peace (1949) - Prison Guard on train (uncredited)
 Dick Barton Strikes Back (1949) - Nick
 Diamond City (1949) - Digger (uncredited)
 Laughter in Paradise (1951) - Card Player (uncredited)
 Wings of Danger (1952) - O'Gorman, henchman (uncredited)
 Lady in the Fog (1952) - Hospital Attendant (uncredited)
 The Gambler and the Lady (1952) - Shadow (uncredited)
 Three Steps to the Gallows (1953) - Sam
 Sea Devils (1953) - Blasquito
 Johnny on the Run (1953) - Bert (uncredited)
 Take a Powder (1953) - Spike
 Johnny on the Spot (1954) - (uncredited)
 Five Days (1954) - Tough in Bar (uncredited)
 Breakaway (1955) - Second Kidnapper (uncredited)
 Cloak Without Dagger (1956) - Sergeant Blake
 Alexander the Great (1956) - Perdiccas
 Port Afrique (1956) - the First Arab
 You Pay Your Money (1957) - 2nd. Thug
 Kill Me Tomorrow (1957) - Carson
 Robbery Under Arms (1957) - Burke
 The Gypsy and the Gentleman (1958) - Cropped Harry
 Carve Her Name with Pride (1958) - German Soldier on Train (uncredited)
 Wonderful Things! (1958) - Minor Role (uncredited)
 A Night to Remember (1958) - Seaman (uncredited)
 The Gun Runners (1958) - (uncredited)
 The Sheriff of Fractured Jaw (1958) - The Gun Guard
 The Man Who Liked Funerals (1959) - Maxie
 First Man Into Space (1959) - Shore Patrolman - Taylor
 The Bandit of Zhobe (1959) - Ahmed
 Two Way Stretch (1960) - Rockingham Quarry Prison Warder (uncredited)
 The Shakedown (1960) - 2nd Thug
 And the Same to You (1960) - Chappy Tuck
 Too Hot to Handle (1960) - Mouth
 The Criminal (1960) - Charles
 Swiss Family Robinson (1960) - Battoo - Pirate
 The Professionals (1960) - Cairns
 The Bulldog Breed (1960) - Fraser (uncredited)
 She'll Have to Go (1961) - Train Driver
 The Singer Not the Song (1961) - Gang Member (uncredited)
 The Long Shadow (1961) - Heinz
 Information Received (1961) - Darnell
 Never Back Losers (1961) - Reilly
 Crosstrap (1962) - Peron
 K.I.L. 1 (1962)
 Nudes of All Nations (1962) - Villager (uncredited)
 In Search of the Castaways (1962) - Ayerton Hijacker One (uncredited)
 On the Beat (1962) - O'Flynn's Henchman (uncredited)
  Lawrence of Arabia  (1962) Turkish Soldier (uncredited)
 Time to Remember (1962) - Garritty
 That Kind of Girl (1963)
 Cleopatra (1963) - Roman Officer (uncredited)
 The Girl Hunters (1963) - The Dragon
 The Man Who Finally Died (1963) - Ernst (uncredited)
 Zulu (1964) - Hughes
 King and Country (1964) - Sergeant Major
 The Curse of the Mummy's Tomb (1964) - Swordsman (uncredited)
 Young Cassidy (1965) - 2nd Theatre Thug (uncredited)
 The High Bright Sun (1965) - Minor Role (uncredited)
 The Intelligence Men (1965) - Stagehand (uncredited)
 Judith (1966)
 Arabesque (1966) - Beshraavi's Henchman (uncredited)
 Kaleidoscope (1966) - Dominion Chauffeur
 The Magnificent Two (1967) - Paco
 Follow That Camel (1967) - Riff
 Casino Royale (1967) - Russian Officer / Cowboy (uncredited)
 Here We Go Round the Mulberry Bush (1968) - Thug in Daydream (uncredited)
 Carry On Up the Khyber (1968) - Burpa at Door-Grid (uncredited)
 Chitty Chitty Bang Bang (1968) - Lieutenant
 The File of the Golden Goose (1969) - Thug
 The Best House in London (1969) - Toff (uncredited)
 One More Time (1970) - Man In pub (uncredited)
 The Wife Swappers (1970) - Leonard
 A Promise of Bed (1970) - Policeman
 The Last Valley (1971) - Garnak
 Kidnapped (1971) - (uncredited)
 Mary, Queen of Scots (1971) - Laird (uncredited)
 Nobody Ordered Love (1972) - Camera operator
 Lady Caroline Lamb (1972) - Man at Bare Knuckle Fight (uncredited)
 Ooh… You Are Awful (1972) - Hood
 Psychomania (1973) - Lorry Driver (uncredited)
 Thriller (UK TV series) (1973 Episode: An Echo of Theresa) - Sagar
 The Creeping Flesh (1973) - 1st Warder
 And Now the Screaming Starts! (1973) - Bearded drunk
 The MacKintosh Man (1973) - Inmate (uncredited)
 S*P*Y*S (1974) - Lippet's Bodyguard
 Carry on Dick (1974) - Tough man
 De Wet's Spoor (1975) - Troop Sgt. Phillips
 One Away (1976) - Foreman
 My Way II (1977)
 Golden Rendezvous (1977) - an Attacker
 Mister Deathman (1977) - Vlees / Vlees' Twin
 Slavers (1978) - Captain George Williams
 Zulu Dawn (1979) - Grenadier (uncredited)
 Prisoners of the Lost Universe (1983) - Vosk
 Stoney: The One and Only (1984) - Fight announcer
 Go for the Gold (1984) - Desk clerk
 Gor (1987) - King Marlenus
 An African Dream (1987) - Arthur Sharp
 Skeleton Coast (1988) - Robbins
 Outlaw of Gor (1988) - Marlenus
 Lethal Woman (1988) - General Grant
 Out on Bail (1989) - Judge Creighton
 Burndown (1990) - Chuck
 The Mangler (1995) - Sheriff Hughes (final film role)

References

External links
 
 Larry Taylor(Aveleyman)

1918 births
2003 deaths
People from Peterborough
British male film actors
British male television actors
British Army personnel of World War II
British emigrants to South Africa